The 1958 Individual Speedway World Championship was the 13th edition of the official World Championship to determine the world champion rider.

In the  World final New Zealander Barry Briggs successfully defended his title and was unbeaten after five heat wins. Ove Fundin took the silver medal but there was an incident filled ride off for the bronze medal. Aub Lawson won that ride off after both Peter Craven and Ken McKinlay fell, Craven remounted to take fourth place.

Nordic Final
8 June 1958
 Växjö
 First 8 to European final

Continental Final
1 June 1958
 Oberhausen
 First 8 to European Final

British/Commonwealth Round

semi final
4 races at 4 venues 
Barry Briggs seeded to World final
 First 10 to World final + 1 reserve

European Final
 22 July 1958
 Warsaw
 First 5 to World final plus 1 reserve

World final
20 September 1958
 London, Wembley Stadium
Referee: E. G. Cope

Classification

References

1958
Individual World Championship
Individual Speedway World Championship
Individual Speedway World Championship
Speedway competitions in the United Kingdom